Panasonic Lumix DMC-FZ150 is a digital camera by Panasonic Lumix. The highest-resolution pictures it records is 12.1 megapixels, through its 25 mm Leica DC VARIO-ELMARIT.
The camera was released for sale in the autumn of 2011. Its successor was the Panasonic Lumix DMC-FZ200.

Property
Ultra Wide-Angle 25 mm
Long Zoom 24X with Power O.I.S
32X With Intelligent Zoom Technology and Electronic Zoom Lever
Leica DC Optics with Exclusive LUMIX Nano Surface Coating
Full 1080/60p HD Movies
New LUMIX Light Speed AF and Venus Engine Technologies

References

External links

DMC-FZ150K on shop.panasonic.com
Panasonic Lumix DMC-FZ150 Review

FZ150
Superzoom cameras